Dara Puspita were an all-female pop group from Surabaya, Indonesia active in the 1960s and early 1970s. The band consisted of Titiek Adji Rachman (lead guitar), Susy Nander (drums), Lies Adji Rachman (rhythm guitar) and Titiek Hamzah (bass).

The band was formed in 1964, with Titiek Rachman (born 1946) and her younger sister Lies (born 1948) on bass. In addition, Ani Kusuma was the rhythm guitarist, and Susy Nander played drums. The Rachman sisters were two of 10 children of Adjie Rachman, formerly a kroncong musician. When Lies left the band for a month in 1965 to finish her education, she was replaced on bass by Titiek Hamzah (born 1949). When Lies returned, Ani Kusuma left the band, and Lies became the rhythm guitarist.

The band faced pressure from the Sukarno regime, which saw rock music as an unwanted Western influence, going so far as to imprison the popular band Koes Bersaudara, and the band sought a safer place to play, performing live in Bangkok, and picking up some Thai influences in their music, including the song "Puyaili", a rock performance of a Thai folk song, as well as their own song Pattaya Beach.

Following the collapse of the Sukarno government in 1965, the band's first LP, Jang Pertama ('the first') was released in 1966, the band released three further LPs in 1966 through 1968. These are in the garage rock genre.

In July 1968 the band left Indonesia, and toured Europe, including West Germany, Hungary, England, France, Belgium, the Netherlands, and Spain, touring for 3 years, before returning to Indonesia on 3 December 1971. Their time in Europe had resulted in only limited recordings, the singles "Welcome To My House/I Believe In Love", and "Ba Da Da Dum/Dream Stealer", which were not successful in Europe. By the time of their return, the years of touring had strained relationships within the band. However, demand for their music in Indonesia was high, and shows performed throughout Indonesia between December and their disbanding on 29 March 1972, were sold out, with as many as 23,000 spectators attending their shows.

After the group ended, only Titiek Hamzah continued in the music industry, releasing some solo albums.

Some of the band's recordings from 1966-1968 have been issued, on The Garage Years released in 2010, and 1966-1968 by Sublime Frequencies in 2010.

Discography

LPs
 1965 - Jang Pertama (Mesra Records LP-4)
 1966 - Dara Puspita a.k.a. Edisi 2 a.k.a. Special Edition (Mesra Records LP-6)
 1967 - Green Green Grass (Mesra Records LP-13)
 1967 - A Go Go (El Sinta A-6708)
 1971 - Tabah dan cobalah (Indra AKL-045)
 1973 - Dara Puspita Min Plus (Indra)
 1974 - Pop Melayu Volume 1 (Remaco )

Singles and EPs
Dara Puspita/Koes Bersaudara EP(Irama EPLN-2)
Welcome To My House/I Believe In Love
BA-DA-DA-DUM/DREAM STEALER 
Surabaya/Cabaleuro (Dutch single)
Mengapa;Lihatlah Adikku/Hai Dengarlah;Bertamasha
Dara Puspita (Bintang BT-107)

References
Garage Hangover - Dara Puspita
Adventures in Feministory: Dara Puspita, The First Indonesian All-Woman Rock Band
Dara Puspita

Indonesian garage rock groups
All-female bands
Indonesian rock music groups